The 1921 Presbyterian Blue Hose football team represented Presbyterian College as an independent during the 1921 college football season. Led by the sixth-year head coach Walter A. Johnson, Presbyterian compiled a record of 1–7. The team captain was Marion Durant.

Schedule

References

Presbyterian
Presbyterian Blue Hose football seasons
Presbyterian Blue Hose football